Pokhi is an Assamese language drama film directed by Jahnu Barua. It was released in 1998 as is the second instalment of his trilogy — the other two being Xagoroloi Bohu Door (1995) and Konikar Ramdhenu (2003). Pokhi won a National Award for Best Feature Film in the Assamese Category in 2000.

References

External links
 

Indian drama films
1998 films
Films set in Assam
Best Assamese Feature Film National Film Award winners
Films directed by Jahnu Barua
1990s Assamese-language films